Christian Alfred Elie Janot (January 4, 1936 – February 23, 2022) was a French physicist and materials scientist known for his work on materials characterization using Mössbauer spectroscopy and his physical metallurgy studies of quasicrystals and noncrystalline materials using neutron scattering techniques.

Education and career 
Janot studied physics and mathematics at the University of Dijon and later joined Armand Hadni at University of Nancy, where he received his PhD in 1963. Janot was one of the founding directors of the Jean Lamour Institute, a joint research institute between CNRS and the University of Lorraine. Between 1982 and 1991, Janot was appointed senior scientist at Institut Laue Langevin in Grenoble, France, and retained a long-term visitor position afterwards. During this period, Janot also became a professor at Joseph Fourier University (later part of Grenoble Alpes University).

Janot cowrote several textbooks in physics and materials science. His classic monograph on quasicrystals was foreworded by the Nobel Laureate Dan Shechtman.

Honors and awards 
Janot was a French Government Overseas Fellow in 1981 at Churchill College, University of Cambridge. He was also a visiting professor at Sapienza University of Rome.

Bibliography

References 

University of Burgundy alumni
1936 births
2022 deaths
French materials scientists
French physicists
20th-century French physicists
Academic staff of Grenoble Alpes University
Academic staff of Nancy-Université
Nancy-Université alumni
People from Saint-Dizier
Metallurgists
Research directors of the French National Centre for Scientific Research